Coup de Theatre is the second studio album by American hip hop group Haiku d'Etat. It was released in 2004.

Critical reception

Dominic Umile of Prefix gave the album a 7.0 out of 10, commenting that "Coup de Theatre, the second course, parts the sea of mediocre major-label nonsense with refreshingly mixed backgrounds and introspective, melodious and often humorous verse." Steve Juon of RapReviews.com gave the album an 8 out of 10, saying: "With so many things going for Haiku D'Etat, it's almost hard to find fault with this album."

Gabe Meline of Metro Silicon Valley named it one of the best hip hop albums of 2004. Jeff Ryce of HipHopDX included it on the "Independent Albums of the Year" list.

Track listing

References

External links
 

2004 albums
Haiku D'Etat albums
Decon albums
Albums produced by Kenny Segal